The Lombard Street riot was a three-day race riot in Philadelphia, Pennsylvania, in 1842. The riot was the last in a 13-year period marked by frequent racial attacks in the city. It started on Lombard Street, between Fifth and Eighth streets.

Background
In the early decades of the 19th century, there were significant increases in the city's black population, as large numbers of freed and fugitive slaves immigrated to Philadelphia, which was a few miles north of the Mason-Dixon line. During the 25 years prior to the riots, the city's black population grew more than 50-percent. At the same time, there were increasing numbers of Irish immigrants who were also separated from the larger society by their insularity and Catholicism.

There were periodic outbreaks of racial, ethnic, and religious violence among Irish Catholics, German Protestants, blacks, and even pacifist Quakers. These were the result of social and economic competition, especially between Irish Catholics and blacks, who were generally at the bottom of the social hierarchy. Many Irish refused to work on labor teams with blacks. According to one writer, Irish Catholics were often competitors for the lowest-paying, unskilled, and menial jobs, and they perceived the city's more successful black residents as flaunting their success, setting the stage for blacks to become targets for the Irish immigrants' frustration.

Riot

On the morning of August 1, 1842, a parade was held by over 1,000 members of the black Young Men's Vigilant Association on Philadelphia's Lombard Street between Fifth and Eighth streets in commemoration of the eighth anniversary of the end of slavery in the British West Indies. As the paraders neared Mother Bethel Church, they were attacked by an Irish Catholic mob. The rioters moved west, setting fires and attacking firefighters and police as they went, heading for the home of African-American leader Robert Purvis. Purvis and his home were reportedly saved from the Irish mob solely by a Catholic priest's intervention.

Requests to the mayor and police for protection initially led to the arrest of several of the victims and none of the rioters. Over three days of attacks, the Second African American Presbyterian Church (on St. Mary's Street near Sixth Street), the abolitionist Smith's Hall, and numerous homes and public buildings were looted, burned and mostly destroyed. The mayor had credible evidence of a plan to burn several local churches, which he ignored. Eventually, as the rioting began to subside, the local militia was brought in to restore order.

Aftermath
Afterward, Mayor John Morin Scott refused to arrest most of those known to have led the riot. Of those arrested by the militia, most were found not guilty or otherwise released. The three or four who were convicted received only light sentences.

Historical marker

In March 2005, the Pennsylvania Historical and Museum Commission approved a historical sign at Sixth and Lombard streets to mark the event.

It reads:Lombard Street Riot — Here on August 1, 1842 an angry mob of whites attacked a parade celebrating Jamaican Emancipation Day. A riot ensued. African Americans were beaten and their homes looted.
The rioting lasted for 3 days. A local church and abolition meeting place were destroyed by fire.

The marker was the result of work by a class of Philadelphia students challenged by their history teacher to research a race riot in the city and argue for its significance. After researching the riot, the students decided that the event was an aspect of a significant part of the city's history that is often ignored. Petitioning for the marker was their way of highlighting the racial intolerance often left out of versions of city history presented to tourists.

The marker stands at Philadelphia's first public recreation facility, Starr Garden, which is a popular playground.

See also

 List of incidents of civil unrest in the United States
Philadelphia Nativist Riots
History of African-Americans in Philadelphia

References

1842 riots
1842 in Pennsylvania
19th century in Philadelphia
African-American history in Philadelphia
Racially motivated violence against African Americans
White American riots in the United States
Irish-American history
Irish-American culture in Philadelphia
Riots and civil disorder in Philadelphia
Attacks on churches in North America
August 1842 events
Attacks on religious buildings and structures in the United States
White American culture in Pennsylvania
American anti-abolitionist riots and civil disorder